The Gaming Act 1710 (9 Ann c 19) was an Act of the Parliament of Great Britain.

The Gaming Act 1710 was largely superseded by the Gaming Act 1968.

The whole Act was repealed by sections 356(3)(a) and (4) of, and Schedule 17 to, the Gambling Act 2005.

Section 1
This section ceased to have effect by virtue of section 334(1)(a) of the Gambling Act 2005.

See also
 History of gambling in the United Kingdom

References
Halsbury's Statutes,

External links
 

Gambling in the United Kingdom
Great Britain Acts of Parliament 1710
Repealed Great Britain Acts of Parliament